Joseph Lin (born 1978) is a Taiwanese-American violinist. From 2011 to 2018, he was the first violinist of the Juilliard String Quartet. Currently, he is on the violin and chamber music faculty of the Juilliard School in New York City.

Early life and education
Lin was born in the United States to immigrant parents from Taiwan. He attended the Juilliard School pre-college division and later graduated magna cum laude from Harvard College in 2000.

Career
He has performed with many orchestras, including the Boston Symphony Orchestra and the New Japan Philharmonic. As a chamber musician, he appears regularly at several festivals, including Ravinia and the Marlboro Music Festival. He was an assistant professor of violin at Cornell University from 2007 to 2011.   In 2010 he was appointed first violinist of the Juilliard String Quartet.  At the completion of the 2017–18 season, he stepped down from the Juilliard String Quartet to devote more time to his four young children, while continuing to teach at the Juilliard School.

In 1996, he won first prize at the Concert Artists Guild International Competition and was named a Presidential Scholar. In 1999, he was the youngest musician to receive the Pro Musicis International award. In 2006, the Formosa Quartet, of which he was a founding member, won first prize in the London International String Quartet Competition.

See also 
 Chinese people in New York City
 Taiwanese people in New York City

References 

Living people
1978 births
American people of Taiwanese descent
American male violinists
Harvard University alumni
Juilliard School faculty
Juilliard School alumni
21st-century American violinists
Juilliard String Quartet members
21st-century American male musicians